The Between The Sheets Tour was a co-headlining concert tour by American recording artists Chris Brown and Trey Songz, along with rapper Tyga supporting, in support of their sixth studio albums X and Trigga, respectively. The tour began on January 27, 2015 in Hampton, Virginia and ended on March 18, 2015 in Greensboro, North Carolina.

Set list 
This set list is representative of the performance at the Barclays Center in Brooklyn on February 16, 2015. It does not represent all concerts on the duration of the tour.

 "Foreign"
 "Cake"
 "Late Night"
 "All We Do"
 "Can't Be Friends"
 "Paranoid"
 "Can't Help but Wait"
 "Slow Motion"
 "I Invented Sex"
 "X"
 "Came to Do"
 "Love More"
 "Wall To Wall"
 "Run It!"
 "Deuces"
 "Strip"
 "Poppin'"
 "Look At Me Now"
 "She Ain't You" 
 "Lady In A Glass Dress"
 "Take You Down"
 "Neighbors Know My Name"
 "No Bullshit"
 "Panty Droppa"
 "2012"
 "Love Faces"
 "Don't Judge Me"
 "Dive In" 
 "Songs on 12 Play"
 "Say Aah"
 "She Knows"
 "Trap Queen"
 "Bottoms Up"
 "Na Na"
 "Touchin, Lovin"
 "New Flame"
 "What Up Gangsta"
 "Many Men"
 "Ayo" 
 "Loyal"

Shows

Cancelled shows

References 

2015 concert tours
Co-headlining concert tours
Chris Brown concert tours